Phillipsville (formerly Kettintelbe, Philippsville, and Phillips Flat) is a census-designated place in Humboldt County, California. It is the southernmost town on the Avenue of the Giants. Near the town is the Chimney Tree. This is a redwood tree that resembles a chimney. The ZIP Code is 95559. The community is inside area code 707. The population was 140 at the 2010 census.

History
A post office operated at Phillipsville from 1883 to 1912, and from 1948 to the present. The name was originally Philips Flat, in honor of George Stump Philips who settled at the place in 1865. The name was changed to Kettintelbe after a local Native American village, but reverted to Phillipsville when the post office reopened in 1948. Phillipsville was home to many popular hotels, including the Riverwood Inn, Madrona Motel, and the DeerHorn Lodge.

Demographics
The 2010 United States Census reported that Phillipsville had a population of 140. The racial makeup of Phillipsville was 121 (86.4%) White, 0 (0.0%) African American, 4 (2.9%) Native American, 1 (0.7%) Asian, 0 (0.0%) Pacific Islander, 0 (0.0%) from other races, and 14 (10.0%) from two or more races. Hispanic or Latino of any race were 3 persons (2.1%).

The Census reported that 140 people (100% of the population) lived in households, 0 (0%) lived in non-institutionalized group quarters, and 0 (0%) were institutionalized.

There were 75 households, out of which 11 (14.7%) had children under the age of 18 living in them, 17 (22.7%) were opposite-sex married couples living together, 10 (13.3%) had a female householder with no husband present, 5 (6.7%) had a male householder with no wife present.  There were 10 (13.3%) unmarried opposite-sex partnerships, and 0 (0%) same-sex married couples or partnerships. 31 households (41.3%) were made up of individuals, and 9 (12.0%) had someone living alone who was 65 years of age or older. The average household size was 1.87.  There were 32 families (42.7% of all households); the average family size was 2.47.

The population was spread out, with 14 people (10.0%) under the age of 18, 14 people (10.0%) aged 18 to 24, 33 people (23.6%) aged 25 to 44, 66 people (47.1%) aged 45 to 64, and 13 people (9.3%) who were 65 years of age or older.  The median age was 48.5 years. For every 100 females, there were 105.9 males.  For every 100 females age 18 and over, there were 100.0 males.

The homeowner vacancy rate was 2.3%; the rental vacancy rate was 0%.  82 people (58.6% of the population) lived in owner-occupied housing units and 58 people (41.4%) lived in rental housing units.

Government

See also

References

Census-designated places in Humboldt County, California
Populated places established in 1865
Census-designated places in California